The CW postcode area, also known as the Crewe postcode area, is a group of twelve postcode districts in England, within eight post towns. These cover much of Cheshire, including Crewe, Northwich, Congleton, Middlewich, Nantwich, Sandbach, Tarporley and Winsford, plus very small parts of Staffordshire and Shropshire.



Coverage
The approximate coverage of the postcode districts:

|-
! CW1
| CREWE
| Crewe (north), Haslington, Leighton
| Cheshire East
|-
! CW2
| CREWE
| Crewe (south), Wistaston, Woolstanwood
| Cheshire East
|-
! CW3
| CREWE
| Madeley, Betley, Woore, Audlem
| Cheshire East, Newcastle-under-Lyme, Shropshire
|-
! CW4
| CREWE
| Holmes Chapel, Goostrey, Cranage, Sproston Green
| Cheshire West and Chester, Cheshire East,
|-
! CW5
| NANTWICH
| Nantwich, Willaston, Sound
| Cheshire East
|-
! CW6
| TARPORLEY
| Tarporley, Winsford Rural West
| Cheshire West and Chester
|-
! CW7
| WINSFORD
| Winsford (Town), Wharton, Over, Glebe Green, Darnhall, Stanthorne, Bostock, Wimboldsley
| Cheshire West and Chester
|-
! CW8
| NORTHWICH
| Northwich (west), Hartford, Weaverham, Castle, Greenbank, Cuddington, Sandiway
| Cheshire West and Chester
|-
! CW9
| NORTHWICH
| Northwich (east), Wincham, Lostock Gralam, Rudheath, Leftwich, Davenham, Kingsmead, Antrobus, Comberbach, Aston by Budworth, Appleton (part), High Legh (part)
| Cheshire West and Chester, Cheshire East, Warrington
|-
! CW10
| MIDDLEWICH
| Middlewich, Winsford Rural East
| Cheshire East, Cheshire West and Chester 
|-
! CW11
| SANDBACH
| Sandbach, Ettiley Heath, Elworth, Wheelock
| Cheshire East
|-
! CW12
| CONGLETON
| Congleton, North Rode
| Cheshire East, Staffordshire Moorlands
|-
! style="background:#FFFFFF;"|CW98
| style="background:#FFFFFF;"|CREWE
| style="background:#FFFFFF;"|
| style="background:#FFFFFF;"|non-geographic
|}

Map

See also
List of postcode areas in the United Kingdom
Postcode Address File

References

External links
Royal Mail's Postcode Address File
A quick introduction to Royal Mail's Postcode Address File (PAF)

Crewe
Postcode areas covering North West England